On 4 May 2021, a school massacre occurred at the municipal school of early childhood education (creche) Aquarela, located in the city of Saudades, near the city of Chapecó, in the Santa Catarina state of Brazil. The school serves children from 6 months to 2 years old. 

Three children, a teacher and a staff member died in the attack, perpetrated by an 18-year-old native of the town, identified by authorities as Fabiano Kipper Mai.

Stabbing
At around 10:00 AM on Tuesday, 4 May 2021, Fabiano Kipper Mai, an 18-year-old youth with no criminal history, rode his bicycle to the Pro-Childhood Aquarela daycare center in downtown Saudades. Upon entering the daycare, he began by attacking a 30-year-old teacher who, although injured, ran into a room where four children and a school employee were, in an attempt to warn her of the danger. Fabiano Mai then attacked the children who were in the room and the employee. Two girls under the age of two and the teacher who suffered the initial attack died on the spot. Another child and the staff member later died in the hospital.

When the city's education secretary, Gisela Hermann, received a call reporting the case, she went to the scene and described what she saw: "We got there, a scene of terror. I managed to get into the school. There was a guy lying on the floor, but still alive, and also a dead teacher and child. The room was closed, they didn't let us in".

Female employees hid the children when the killer began the attack.

The Chapecó regional delegate, Ricardo Newton Casagrande, said that the young man entered the place and hit the victims with a katana.

Fabiano Mai was arrested on the spot and taken in serious condition to a hospital in the neighboring city of Pinhalzinho, after trying to commit suicide by stabbing himself with a katana.

Victims
 Keli Adriane Aniecevski, 30 years old, teacher;
 Mirla Amanda Renner Costa, 20 years old, educational agent; 
 Sarah Luiza Mahle Sehn, 19 months old;
 Murilo Massing, 21 months old;
 Anna Bela Fernandes de Barros, 20 months old.

Another 20-month old child, named Henrique, was also injured and had to undergo surgery and stay in the ICU.

School staff
Deputy Jerônimo Ferreira, who is handling the case, says that the teacher and the educational agent were heroes in containing the youth from going to other classrooms and even though they were injured, they managed to successfully avoid the worst:

 

Aline Biazebetti, a 27-year old educational agent and a neighbor of the school, rescued one of the children. When she heard the commotion, she entered the school while the aggressor was still there, removed a one-and-a-half-year old child, got into a car and drove to the hospital. The child in question underwent surgery and is recovering from his injuries. Without Aline's quick action, the one-year-old could have been dead before the rescue arrived.

Official mourning
The state governor, Daniela Reinehr, announced official mourning on her Twitter. "I decree official mourning of three days in the state after the tragedy in Saudades, where children and teachers of a center for early childhood education died. I express deep sadness and provide my solidarity. I have determined that the government will provide all necessary support to the families," she wrote.

See also
 Suzano school shooting
 Janaúba massacre
 Rio de Janeiro school shooting
 Goyases School shooting
 Campinas Cathedral shooting

References

2021 murders in Brazil
Attacks on schools in Brazil
Deaths by blade weapons
Mass stabbings
Massacres in 2021
Mass murder in Brazil
May 2021 crimes in South America
School killings in South America
School massacres
Mass murder in 2021
Stabbing attacks in 2021
May 2021 events in Brazil